The 1966 Texas Longhorns football team represented the University of Texas at Austin during the 1966 NCAA University Division football season.

Schedule

Game summaries

USC

Texas Tech
Gregg Lott opened the contest with an 88-yard kickoff return for a touchdown while sophomore quarterback Bill Bradley also starred, hitting an 80-yard quick kick that stopped just short of the Tech goal line.

References

Texas
Texas Longhorns football seasons
Bluebonnet Bowl champion seasons
Texas Longhorns football